Golden Rooster Award for Best Foreign Language Film is the main category of Competition of Golden Rooster Awards, awarding to foreign language films. When the first Golden Rooster Awards ceremony was held in 1981, there was no separate category for foreign language films because its awards were only given to domestic. It was created in 2021 for foreign language speaking films.

2020s

References 

Foreign Language Film
Awards established in 2021